A Yank in Viet-Nam is a 1964 war drama film. It was filmed entirely in South Vietnam during the Vietnam War.

Plot
The film follows a U.S. Marine Corps pilot (Marshall Thompson) who is shot down over the Vietnamese jungle. In his endeavor to get to safety, he meets a female guerrilla fighter (Kieu Chinh) and a nationalist named Hong (played by the Filipino actor Mario Barri).

Cast
 Marshall Thompson as The Major
 Kieu Chinh as The Girl
 Mario Barri as Hong
 Enrique Magalona as Guerrilla Leader

Production
In addition to acting in the film, Marshall Thompson also served as the film's director. The screenplay is by Jane Wardell and Jack Lewis, based on a story by Lewis. The film was originally to be titled Year of the Tiger but in November 1963 it was retitled A Yank in Viet-Nam.

See also
List of American films of 1964

References

Thompson, Howard. "A Yank in Viet-Nam (1964): War in the Jungles of Southeast Asia." The New York Times, February 6, 1964.

External links

1964 films
Vietnam War films
American war drama films
Films shot in Vietnam
Films about the United States Marine Corps
Films scored by Richard LaSalle
Allied Artists films
1960s American films